Ezinne Kalu (born 26 June 1992) is a Nigerian-American basketball player for Landerneau Bretagne Basket and the Nigerian national team. In the 2017, 2019 and 2021 Afrobasket events, she represented D'Tigress, Africa's highest-ranked side and won three straight championship for them. She was named 2019 Women's Afrobasket Most Valuable Player (MVP).

Early life
She was born in Newark, New Jersey to Gwendolyn Covington and Joseph Kalu. Her mother was born and raised in Greenville, SC. Her father is Nigerian.

Kalu attended Science Park High School in Newark, New Jersey. She was the first woman in the school's history to score over 2,000 points. Her jersey was retired in December 2017. After graduating in 2010, Kalu received a full scholarship to HBCU Savannah State University in Savannah, GA. Her team won their first MEAC Championship in 2015. She was also the first to score over 2,000 career points in the school. She graduated in May 2015 with a bachelor's degree in African Studies.

Professional career
After graduating from Savannah State, Kalu spent two seasons in the Portuguese Championship. In 2015, she signed with Clube Desportivo Torres Novas (22.7 points, 6.0 rebounds and 5.1 assists). At the end of her first season in Portugal, she signed for Olivais Coimbra (21.5 points, 4.0 rebounds and 4.3 assists).

In 2017, Kalu signed with Hungarian club Vasas Akademia for one season (17.0 points, 3.4 rebounds and 3.9 assists).

In November 2018, she signed with German club Keltern. She helped Keltern qualify for the final of the German Championship (13.6 points and 2.5 assists).

In 2019, she joined the French side Landerneau BB, averaging 15.7 points, 3.4 rebounds and 3.2 assists in the 2019-2020 season.

2021 AfroBasket tournament champion
2020 Guard of the Year, France 1st Division
2020 1st Team, All-Imports France League
2020 1st Team, All-French Player
2020 Qualified for the Tokyo Olympics (July 2021)
2020 All-Star top 5 of the Olympic qualifying tournament in Serbia
2020 Voted Top 12 Best Player of Africa
2019 1st woman to be sponsored by AFA Sports
2019 AfroBasket tournament champion (5-0 record)
2019 MVP of AfroBasket tournament
2019 Top 5 player of AfroBasket tournament
2018 Co-Captain of the Nigeria women's national basketball team
2017 Defensive Player of the Year, Budapest 1st Division
2017 AfroBasket tournament champion (8-0 record)
2016-17 Captain of the Nigerian women's national team
2016 Guard of the Year, Portugal 1st Division

International career
Kalu played for the Nigerian national team at the 2016 FIBA women's Olympic qualifying tournament.

She participated in the 2017 Women's Afrobasket, where she averaged 12 pts and 3 assists per game. The team won the tournament.
Kalu participated in the 2018 FIBA Women's Basketball World Cup in Spain for the Nigerian national basketball team. She averaged 10.6 points, 3 rebounds and 4.1 assists per game during the tournament.

Kalu then participated in the 2019 Women's Afrobasket, where she was named Most Valuable player of the tournament. She averaged 14 points and 3 assists during the tournament. She competed at 2020 FIBA Olympic qualifying tournament, averaging 16 points, 2.7 rebounds and 4.3 assists per game. She was named to the all Star five of the FIBA Olympic qualifying tournament held in Serbia

Kalu also participated in Tokyo 2020 Olympics in July 2021 and was part of the Nigerian team that narrowly lost to Team USA, leading the team with 16 points. In September 2021, she participated in the Afrobasket tournament  emerging champion with Nigeria's D'Tigress averaging 12.4 points, 3 rebounds and 4.6 assists per game. She was named to the All Star team of the tournament.

References

External links

1992 births
Living people
Nigerian women's basketball players
Basketball players from Newark, New Jersey
Point guards
Nigerian expatriate basketball people in Germany
Nigerian expatriate basketball people in Hungary
Nigerian expatriate basketball people in Portugal
Nigerian expatriate basketball people in France
American expatriate basketball people in France
Basketball players at the 2020 Summer Olympics
Olympic basketball players of Nigeria
American expatriate basketball people in Germany
American expatriate basketball people in Hungary
American expatriate basketball people in Portugal
American women's basketball players
Citizens of Nigeria through descent
African-American basketball players
Nigerian people of African-American descent
American emigrants to Nigeria
American sportspeople of Nigerian descent
21st-century African-American sportspeople
African-American sportswomen